Lebanon sent a delegation to compete at the 2008 Summer Paralympics in Beijing, People's Republic of China.

Medallists
The country won two medals, both bronze.

Sports

Cycling

Men's road

See also
Lebanon at the Paralympics
Lebanon at the 2008 Summer Olympics

References

External links
International Paralympic Committee

Nations at the 2008 Summer Paralympics
2008
Summer Paralympics